Exophyla rectangularis is a moth of the family Noctuidae first described by Carl Geyer in 1828. It is found in Ukraine, Romania, Bulgaria, Albania, Greece, Montenegro, Croatia, northern Italy, Mediterranean Turkey, Lebanon, Israel and Turkmenistan.

There is one generation per year in the Middle East. Adults are on wing in early summer.

The larvae feed on Celtis, mostly Celtis australis.

External links

Calpinae
Moths of Europe
Moths of the Middle East
Moths described in 1828